Mohammad Siddikur Rahman (born 20 November 1984) is a Bangladeshi professional golfer who plays on the Asian Tour.

As an amateur, Siddikur won twelve events in Asia, winning five times in Bangladesh, two in Pakistan, Sri Lanka, and Nepal and one in India. Siddikur turned professional in 2005 and joined the Professional Golf Tour of India in 2006. He picked up his first win on tour in 2008 at the PGTI Players Championship at Poona Golf Club and he picked up his second victory two months later at the HUDA-GTPL – Unitech Haryana Open. Siddikur won his third event in 2009 at The Global Green Bangalore Open and his fourth event in 2010 at the American Express Bangladesh Open.

Siddikur joined the Asian Tour in 2009 after finishing in the top 40 at qualifying school. He finished 84th on the Order of Merit for the 2009 season. Siddikur became the first Bangladeshi golfer to win an Asian Tour event at the Brunei Open in August 2010. Siddikur went to a playoff with South African Jbe' Kruger and defeated him on the first extra hole. Kruger missed a 10-foot par putt to extend the playoff.

On 10 July 2016, Siddikur became the first Bangladeshi ever to qualify for the Olympic Games after finishing 56th in the final eligibility list for the Rio 2016 Games; all previous Olympians from Bangladesh had been wild-card selections. He finished the tournament in 58th place.

Professional wins (11)

Asian Tour wins (2)

Asian Tour playoff record (1–2)

Asian Development Tour wins (2)

1Co-sanctioned by the Professional Golf Tour of India

Professional Golf Tour of India wins (7)

1Co-sanctioned by the Asian Development Tour

ASEAN PGA Tour wins (1)

Results in World Golf Championships

"T" = Tied

Team appearances
Professional
World Cup (representing Bangladesh): 2013
EurAsia Cup (representing Asia): 2014

References

External links

Profile on the Professional Golf Tour of India's official site

Bangladeshi male golfers
Asian Tour golfers
Olympic golfers of Bangladesh
Golfers at the 2016 Summer Olympics
Golfers at the 2006 Asian Games
Asian Games competitors for Bangladesh
1984 births
Living people